Mega Shark or megashark may refer to:

Sharks
 Megalodon, a very large extinct shark
 Whale shark, the largest living species of shark
 Great white shark, one of the largest living species of predatory shark
 Megamouth shark, a shark with a very large mouth

The Asylum's Mega Shark film series
Mega Shark (film series), a series of films by the American independent film company The Asylum 
Mega Shark Versus Giant Octopus, 2009 American-British monster/disaster film
Mega Shark Versus Crocosaurus, 2010 monster disaster film 
Mega Shark Versus Mecha Shark, 2014 direct-to-video monster/disaster film
Mega Shark vs. Kolossus, 2015 monster science fiction film

Other uses
Malibu Shark Attack (aka Mega Shark of Malibu), 2009 TV film, directed by David Lister and produced for the Syfy channel

See also
 Shark (disambiguation)
 Mega (disambiguation)